Carina Susana Vitulano (born 22 July 1975) is an Italian football referee. Vitulano shrugged off a serious knee injury sustained at the 2014 FIFA U-20 Women's World Cup to be selected for the 2015 FIFA Women's World Cup.

Carina's father Miguel Vitulano was born in Manfredonia but grew up in Argentina, where Carina was born. He returned to Italy and played football for Livorno while raising his three daughters. Miguel died of a heart attack aged 58 in 2009. Engineering graduate Carina is a mother of two children: Filippo and Alessia.

References

External links

Profile

Living people
1975 births
Sportspeople from Buenos Aires
Italian football referees
Women association football referees
Argentine people of Italian descent
Argentine emigrants to Italy
Sportspeople from Livorno
FIFA Women's World Cup referees
Italian sportswomen